Sir Hervey Juckes Lloyd Bruce, 4th Baronet(5 Oct. 1843; died 8 May 1919) was High Sheriff of County Londonderry in 1903.

The son of Sir Henry Hervey Bruce, 3rd Baronet and Marianne  Juckes- Clifton, he was educated at Eton College. He was an officer in the Coldstream Guards from 1862 until 1878. In 1872 he married  Ellen Maud Ricardo: they had four sons.

References

1843 births
1919 deaths
People educated at Eton College
High Sheriffs of County Londonderry
Baronets in the Baronetage of the United Kingdom
Coldstream Guards officers